Referent power is a form of reverence gained by a leader who has strong interpersonal relationship skills. Referent power, as an aspect of personal power, becomes particularly important as organizational leadership becomes increasingly about collaboration and influence and less about command and control.

In an organizational setting, referent power is most easily seen in the charismatic leader who excels in making others feel comfortable in his or her presence. Staff typically express their excitement about work in terms of their attraction to their leader's personal characteristics and charisma. They commit to their work because of the leader's likability, and they base their self-esteem and sense of accomplishment on their leader's approval.

Referent power may be defined as 'the ability of a leader to influence a follower due to the follower's admiration, respect, or identification with the leader'. It has been suggested  that the term referent power may reflect a misspelling, with a more appropriate label being reverent power. The Cambridge English Dictionary defines reverent as "showing great respect and admiration", whereas "referent" is typically defined as "the thing that a symbol stands for, or refers to". Bertram Raven states that "Referent power stems from the target identifying with the agent, or seeing the agent as a model that the target would want to emulate".

See also 
Power (social and political)
French and Raven's bases of power
Information power

References

Further reading
French, J., & Raven, B. The bases of social power. Studies in social power (1959).
Taylor, Peplau, & Sears (2006). Social Psychology (12th ed.). Upper Saddle River: Pearson Education, Inc. 
Joseph C. Thomas. "Leadership Effectiveness of Referent Power as a Distinction of Personal Power", Regent University Center for Leadership Studies, LEAD605 Foundations of Effective Leadership, 18-Feb-2002

Sociological terminology
Power (social and political) concepts